The Christmas Island earwig (Anisolabis subarmata) is a species of earwig in the family Anisolabididae.

Taxonomy
The Christmas Island earwig was described as a new species in 1900 by English entomologist William Forsell Kirby. The holotype had been collected by Charles William Andrews on Christmas Island. Kirby placed it in the genus Labia, with a scientific name of Labia subarmata.

Biology and conservation
Very little is known about the Christmas Island earwig, as it is one of twenty-four invertebrate species endemic to Christmas Island that have not been detected since 1902.

See also
 List of Dermapterans of Australia

References

Anisolabididae
Fauna of Christmas Island
Insects described in 1900